Slone Glacier is a glacier descending along the north side of Slagle Ridge in the Admiralty Mountains to enter the west side of Moubray Glacier. Mapped by United States Geological Survey (USGS) from surveys and U.S. Navy air photos, 1960–63. Named by Advisory Committee on Antarctic Names (US-ACAN) for Airman Kelly Slone, United States Air Force (USAF), who perished in the crash of a C-154 Globemaster aircraft in this vicinity in 1958.

Glaciers of Victoria Land
Borchgrevink Coast